Dreams of India is a radio drama, produced by the ZBS Foundation. It is the seventh of the Jack Flanders adventure series and the second of the Travels with Jack sub-series. It combines elements of American culture and Old-time radio with themes of Sufism, Hindu mysticism and poetry.

Plot
Jack is approached by the remarkably beautiful and captivating Kamala who wishes to speak to him on behalf of her aunt who, restless and troubled, needs the help of a charming man she met forty years ago who knew that one day, many years later, she would need his help and thus he gave her his card. Now that time has come, so she sends her niece with the aged and faded card to New York to find this man, someone called Jack Flanders.

And so Jack is off on another adventure via New Delhi, Bombay and Bangalore to an old and crumbling painted palace within which a presence dwells. A presence that has a few surprises in store for Mr. Flanders.

Notes & Themes
Jack is clearly very attracted to Kamala but she keeps him at arm's length and insists that he maintain a sense of decorum - i.e. refusing to come to his room unless he is properly attired.

While this is set mainly in the 'real world', Jack does encounter a being from the Invisible Realms and has some very 'otherworldly' experiences.

There are numerous quotes from the Bengali poet, Rabindranath Tagore, traded between the main characters.

Received the Audiophile Golden Earphone Award for a "truly exceptional audio presentation".

Quotes
Jack: "Right! Body or no body, let's get out of here."

Credits
 Jack Flanders - Robert Lorick
 Kamala Shukla - Sakina Jaffrey
 Lalitha Chatterjee - Madhur Jaffrey
 Ramchandra - Sohrab Ardeshir
 Additional Characters - Hesh Malkar
 Executive Producer - Thomas Manuel Lopez
 Story & Script - Meatball Fulton
 Additional ideas - Marcia Dale Lopez
 Additional Music - Tim Clark
 Director - T. Lopez
 Engineers - Robert Harrari and Fulton
 Illustration - Alan Okamoto
 Graphics - Jaye Oliver

North Indian Bamboo Flute, composed and performed by John Berdy from Journey to Qayyum, Nerverland Records.

"Production was made possible through grants from the National Endowment for the Arts, and donations from people like you, maybe even you. Thank you."

"For words of inspiration, a special thanks to Sathya Sai Baba, Paramahansa Yogananda, Rabindranath Tagore and Roy Eugene Davis. Also thanks to the Tibetan master, Djuhal Khul. Additional moral support was provided by Sid's Ashram and Grill. Dedicated to the memory of Swami Rudinandra, affectionately known to us as Rudi."

Travels with Jack
All of the installments in this sub-series are entitled Dreams of ... although ZBS produced two others with a similar title  – Dreams of Rio and Dreams of the Blue Morpho – which are not part of the series.

Each story involves Jack being approached by a beautiful woman who asks for his help. In three of them he is sitting in a restaurant, eating alone, when this happens. The fourth, Dreams of Bali does begin with a strange dream concerning food, but starts after Jack has already accepted the invitation and been flown out.

These are the only stories in which Jack asks that his expenses be paid.

 Dreams of the Amazon (1992)
 Dreams of India (1992)
 Dreams of Bali (1992)
 Dreams of Sumatra (1993)

References

External links
 ZBS Foundation
 Whirlitzer of Wisdom fansite

American radio dramas
ZBS Foundation
1992 radio programme debuts